Triodus is an extinct genus of xenacanthidan shark that lived from the Carboniferous to the Triassic. It was a freshwater shark, and fossils have been found in the Chinle Formation and Black Prince Limestone of Arizona, the Petrified Forest Member of New Mexico and the Tecovas Formation of Texas, United States. In 2017, a new species Triodus richterae was described from the Rio do Rasto Formation of Brazil.

References

Further reading 
 The Rise of Fishes: 500 Million Years of Evolution by John A. Long

Prehistoric shark genera
Carboniferous sharks
Permian sharks
Triassic sharks
Prehistoric fish of North America
Carboniferous United States
Permian United States
Triassic United States
Prehistoric fish of South America
Permian Brazil
Fossils of Brazil
Paraná Basin
Fossil taxa described in 1849